Nir Banim (lit. Sons' Meadow) is a moshav in south-central Israel. Located near Kiryat Gat, it falls under the jurisdiction of Be'er Tuvia Regional Council.

History
The moshav was founded in 1954 by sons of residents of the moshavim of Be'er Tuvia, Kfar Vitkin, Kfar Yehezkel, Nahalal and Herut. This was also the source of its name. It was established on land that had belonged to the depopulated Palestinian village of al-Sawafir al-Sharqiyya.

Notable residents
Nitzan Alon

References

Moshavim
Populated places established in 1954
Populated places in Southern District (Israel)
1954 establishments in Israel